Historic Congregation B’nai Abraham is a synagogue located in the Society Hill section of Center City, Philadelphia. It is an active congregation with daily, Shabbat, and holy day services. B'nai Abraham is home to a Jewish Preschool, as well as Lubavitch of Center City.

Russian Shul, 1874-1891
B'nai Abraham was established in 1874 as the "Russian shul". An 1881 almanac identifies the name as Beth Hamedrosh Hagadol B'nai Abraham Anshe Russe.  Its congregants officially incorporated in 1882 as Chevra B’nai Avrohom Mi Russe. The synagogue would continue to be known as B'nai Abraham Anshe Russa; Congregation B’nai Abraham; the B’nai Abraham Congregation; and later as Historic Congregation B’nai Abraham.

Rabbi Israel M. Sacks served as first official rabbi of the congregation as early as 1881. 

B'nai Abraham grew in the 1880s with increased immigration of Jews from Russia and Eastern Europe and their settlement in Philadelphia in the city's Jewish quarter. In 1885, B'nai Abraham purchased a building at 521 Lombard Street for $3,000 built in 1820 by the Wesley Church, an AME Zion congregation, who had broken away from Mother Bethel A.M.E. Church, 419 South Sixth Street. By 1885, Wesley Church's congregation had outgrown the building. The 1885 dedication of the synagogue building was attended by Marcus Jastrow, rabbi of the city's German congregation, and Sabato Morais, rabbi of the Spanish and Portuguese congregation.

Rabbi Bernard Leventhal, 1891-1953

Rabbi Eliazar Kleinberg, Chief Rabbi of Vilna, assumed the pulpit of the congregation in 1889 and served for two years before his passing. In September 1891, Rabbi Kleinberg was succeeded by his son-in-law, R. Bernard L. Levinthal. Rabbi Levinthal would serve as the congregation rabbi until his passing on September 23, 1952. 

B'nai Abraham had 225 members and 150 seat holders in 1900. 

In 1909, B'nai Abraham retained the services of contractor Samuel Lashner & Co. to construct a new building at a cost of $28,000. It was designed by architect Charles W. Bolton & Co. in the style of Byzantine Revival. Bolton and his firm had designed B'nai Reuben, built on South Sixth Street in 1905. They took as inspiration for B'nai Abraham's new building the Pike Street Synagogue (Congregation Sons of Israel Kalwarie) built in 1903 and 1904 at 13-15 Pike Street in Manhattan, and designed by the architect Alfred E. Badt. Demolition of the old building began on May 10, 1909 and the new building was dedicated April 1910.

The building was struck by lightning in July 1926, igniting a fire that caused $75,000 in damages to the property. The synagogue then housed twenty three Torah scrolls all of which were rescued.

B'nai Abraham, 1954-present

Rabbi H. Zvi Gottesman succeeded R. Levinthal on a part-time basis in 1954. 

Society Hill's Jewish population contracted in the 1960s and 1970s, and B'nai Abraham identified as a Conservative congregation by 1974. 

Rabbi Ezekiel Musleah (1927-2020), from Kolkata served as rabbi from 1979 until 1982. 

Rabbi Yochonon Goldman became the congregation's rabbi in 2000 and continues to serve in this capacity in 2019.

The congregation had 75 members in 2011.

Congregation B'nai Abraham at 523-527 Lombard is now the oldest Philadelphia synagogue built as a synagogue and still in continuous use as such.

The Philadelphia Historical Commission added Congregation B'nai Abraham to the Philadelphia Register of Historic Places on Dec. 31, 1984.

References

External links 

Facebook/Bnai Abraham Chabad

Ashkenazi Jewish culture in Philadelphia
Ashkenazi synagogues
Society Hill, Philadelphia
Synagogues in Philadelphia
Tourist attractions in Philadelphia
Synagogues completed in 1910
Russian-American culture in Pennsylvania
Russian-Jewish culture in the United States
1910 establishments in Pennsylvania